Akanat Promphan (born 12 January 1986) is a Thai politician and former Democrat MP who served as Private Secretary to Deputy Prime Minister Suthep Thaugsuban in the government of Abhisit Vejjajiva and as a spokesman for the People's Democratic Reform Committee protest movement.

Early life and education

Akanat was born on 12 January 1986 Bangkok as the second son of Pornthep Techapaibul and Srisakul Promphan, who later divorced. His father, Pornthep, once served as a deputy minister in the government of Chuan Leekpai, while his mother, sister of veteran Democrat politician Niphon Promphan, eventually remarried Suthep Thaugsuban.

He attended Saint Gabriel's College in Bangkok until he was 10, after which he studied in Australia, and then at Charterhouse School in the United Kingdom. He read  engineering, economics and management at St John's College, Oxford, receiving a bachelor's and a master's degree.

Political career

Akanat entered politics shortly after graduating from Oxford, becoming private secretary to his stepfather, Suthep, then Deputy Prime Minister. Akanat  was subsequently elected a Democrat Member of Parliament representing Bangkok in the 2011 general elections. At 25, he was the youngest MP elected that year. He and other members of his family received acclaim for his work during the 2011 Thailand floods, where he delivered food and other supplies to aid kitchens in Bangkok and Southern Thailand.

In June 2013 he resigned from Parliament, to help lead the People's Democratic Reform Committee dedicated to ousting the government of Yingluck Shinawatra, and served as the organisation's spokesman. After the removal of the Yingluck government and coup d'état in 2014, Akanat joined Suthep in being ordained as a monk for a year.

References

1986 births
Living people
Alumni of St John's College, Oxford
Akanat Promphan